"Bring It Back" is a song written and recorded by Australian DJ and producers Will Sparks and Joel Fletcher. The song was digitally released on 13 September 2013.

Track listing
Digital download
 "Bring It Back" (radio edit) – 2:48
 "Bring It Back" – 5:01

Charts

Weekly charts
"Bring It Back" debuted on the ARIA Singles Chart at number 44 and peaked at number 33 six weeks later.

Year-end charts

Certification

References

2013 singles
2013 songs
Ministry of Sound singles